The 1978 WCT World Doubles was a tennis tournament played on indoor carpet courts in Kansas City, United States that was part of the 1978 Colgate-Palmolive Grand Prix. It was the tour finals for the doubles season of the WCT Tour section. The tournament was held from May 3 through May 7, 1978. It was the first edition to operate a Round robin system.

Final

Doubles
 Wojtek Fibak /  Tom Okker defeated  Robert Lutz /  Stan Smith 6–7, 6–4, 6–0, 6–3

References

WCT World Doubles
World Championship Tennis World Doubles
1978 in sports in Missouri